The French Expeditionary Corps, also known as the French Expeditionary Corps in Italy, was an expeditionary force of the French Liberation Army. Created in 1943, the corps fought in the Italian Campaign of World War II, under the command of General Alphonse Juin. Consisting of 112,000 men divided into four divisions, all but one of the divisions were colonial units, mostly Moroccans and Algerians drawn from the Army of Africa and led by French officers.

The corps distinguished itself in battles, sweeping across mountain ranges with astonishing speed and efficiency, however that success was tarnished by the large numbers of looting, rape and murder committed on the local Italian population. In August 1944 the corps was withdrawn and absorbed into the French First Army under General de Lattre de Tassigny for the invasion of Southern France.

Background and Formation

After the Americans landed in Algiers in 1942 during Operation Torch, the colonial troops of the French Army of Africa, until then under the orders of the pro-Nazi republic of Vichy, surrendered without firing a shot. General Charles De Gaulle, head of the French government in exile, drew on this military personnel to create the CEF (Corp Expeditionnaire Français). The CEF was made up of two-thirds native Africans (Moroccans, Algerians and Senegalese) and one-third French settlers for a total of 112,000 men divided into four divisions. Most of the African troops of the French Expeditionary Corps had grown up in the Atlas Mountains of North Africa, they were the Allies’ only units skilled and equipped for mountain warfare. There were some exclusively Moroccan units of goumiers (from the Arabic ) whose soldiers came from the Riff mountains and were grouped in units called "tabor" with tribal or direct family ties, there were 7,833 Moroccan Goumiers in total. French colonial units consisted of indigenous, conscripted soldiers recruited by tribe, ethnicity, or region, as well as some non-French mercenary soldiers from the Foreign Legion.
The CEF was equipped with allied weapons (Thompson submachine gun cal. 45 mm and Browning machine gun 12.7 mm) as well as, for the Moroccans, a traditional curved dagger called a koumia.

Order of battle
The campaign was under the command of Lieutenant General Mark W. Clark of the U.S. Fifth Army. The commander of the corps was General Alphonse Juin, future Maréchal de France, Juin was himself a pied-noir from Bone in Algeria who had commanded Arabs and Berbers much of his life. He was assisted by General Marcel Carpentier.

Other notable officers were General Joseph de Goislard de Monsabert (3rd DIA), General François Sevez, General André-Marie-François Dody and General Diego Brosset. General Augustin Guillaume was in command of the three Moroccan tabors (similar in size to a large battalion).

1st Free French Division 

Also known as: 1st Motorized Infantry Division.

(General Diego Brosset), arrived in Italy in April 1944
1st Brigade (13th Foreign Legion Demi-Brigade and 22nd Bataillon de marche Nord Africain
2nd Brigade (4th, 5th and 11th Bataillon de Marche)
4th Brigade (21st, 24th Bataillon de Marche and Bataillon d'Infanterie de Marine du Pacifique(BIMP))
1st Regiment d'Artillerie Coloniale(RAC)
1st Regiment de Fusiliers Marins (RFM)

2nd Moroccan Infantry Division 

(General André Dody), arrived in Italy end of November 1943
4th Regiment de Tirailleurs Marocains (RTM)  
5th Regiment de Tirailleurs Marocains (RTM) 
8th Regiment de Tirailleurs Marocains (RTM)  
3rd Regiment de Spahis Marocains (RSM)  
63rd Regiment d'Artillerie d'Afrique (RAA)

3rd Algerian Infantry Division 

(General Joseph de Goislard de Monsabert), arrived in Italy in December 1943
3rd Regiment de Tirailleurs Algériens (RTA)
4th Regiment de Tirailleurs Tunisiens (RTT)
7th Regiment de Tirailleurs Algériens (RTA)
3rd Regiment de Spahis Algériens de Reconnaissance (RSAR)
67th Regiment d'Artillerie d'Afrique (RAA)

4th Moroccan Mountain Division

(General François Sevez), arrived in Italy in February 1944
1st Regiment de Tirailleurs Marocains (RTM)
2nd Regiment de Tirailleurs Marocains (RTM)
6th Regiment de Tirailleurs Marocains (RTM)
4th Regiment de Spahis Marocains (RSM)
69th Regiment d'Artillerie de Montagne (RAM)

General Reserves 
Command of Moroccan Goumiers (General Augustin Guillaume)
1st Groupe de Tabors Marocains (GTM)
3rd Groupe de Tabors Marocains (GTM)
4th Groupe de Tabors Marocains (GTM)
7th Régiment de Chasseurs d'Afrique  (RCA)
8th Régiment de Chasseurs d'Afrique  (RCA)
64th Regiment d'Artillerie d'Afrique (RAA)

Anti-Aircraft Artillery Troops 
(Brigadier general Aaron Bradshaw Jr., U.S.A.)

First and fourth battle of Monte Cassino

The first of the FEC troops at the front was the 2nd Moroccan Division with the 4th GTM attached, in January the 3rd Algerian Division joined the Moroccans. It was positioned in the high mountains at the extreme right of the U.S. Fifth Army. Used to mountain fighting, the FEC pushed back the German 5th Mountain Division taking Monte Belvedere and Colle Abate but stopped before being able to take Monte Cifalco after suffering heavy casualties and lacking reinforcements. The Allied command decided to settle down to reinforce and reorganise for a spring campaign code-named ‘‘Diadem’’ set for May 11. New units were added: The 1st French Motorized Division, the 4th Moroccan Mountain Division, as well as another group of Tabors, the 1st GTM.

In the next two battles, much smaller affairs on a narrow front around Cassino town, the corps was not involved. For the fourth and final battle the Fifth Army's front had been compressed towards the coast to allow the British Eighth Army's XIII Corps and II Polish Corps to join the line. During this battle, launched 11 May 1944, the Corps attacked into the inhospitable Aurunci Mountains which the Germans had considered impassable by modern infantry. The progress made by the corps and in particular the lightly loaded goumiers, capturing Monte Maio and pushing deep into the Aurunci, threatened the flanks of the German forces on their right in the Liri valley fighting against XIII Corps. The Germans were consequently forced to withdraw allowing XIII Corps to advance up the Liri valley and the Polish Corps on the right to occupy on 18 May the heights of Monte Cassino and the abbey reduced to rubble on top of it.

Breaking of the Gustav Line

In his autobiography, Mark W. Clark describes how the FEC broke through the Gustav Line in May 1944.

Meantime, the French forces had crossed the Garigliano (River) and moved forward into the mountainous terrain lying south of the Liri River. It was not easy. As always, the German veterans reacted strongly and there was bitter fighting. The French surprised the enemy and quickly seized key terrain including Mounts Faito Cerasola and high ground near Castelforte. The 1st Motorized Division helped the 2nd Moroccan division take key Mount Girofano and then advanced rapidly north to S. Apollinare and S. Ambrogio  In spite of the stiffening enemy resistance, the 2nd Moroccan Division penetrated the Gustav Line in less than two day’s fighting. The next 48 hours on the French front were decisive. The knife-wielding Goumiers swarmed over the hills, particularly at night, and General Juin’s entire force showed an aggressiveness hour after hour that the Germans could not withstand. Cerasola, San Giogrio, Mt. D’Oro, Ausonia and Esperia were seized in one of the most brilliant and daring advances of the war in Italy, and by May 16 the French Expeditionary Corps had thrust forward some ten miles on their left flank to Mount Revole, with the remainder of their front slanting back somewhat to keep contact with the British 8th Army. For this performance, which was to be a key to the success of the entire drive on Rome, I shall always be a grateful admirer of General Juin and his magnificent FEC... The 8th Army’s delay made Juin’s task more difficult because he was moving forward so rapidly that his right flank---adjacent to the British---constantly was exposed to counter-attacks.

The battle for the Gustav Line had been difficult for the FEC. It had been involved in violent combat in the mountains. Then, while Clark entered Rome, the FEC attacked the east of the city securing the road to Siena and capturing it. After the campaign, the soldiers were withdrawn to Africa to join the Army B that had landed in southern France after Operation Dragoon.

Casualties
The casualties for the campaign were approximately 6,500 killed in action, 2,000 missing and 23,000 wounded. The combatants of the C.E.F. rest in the French military cemeteries of Monte Mario (Rome) and Venafro.

Triumph and disgrace

Praised from Allied military leaders 
In a letter to Marechal Juin, General Mark Clark paid tribute to the Tirailleur units and Goumiers of the CEF :

For me, it has been a deep source of satisfaction to see how the vital part played by the French troops of the Fifth Army throughout our Italian campaign against the common enemy has been universally acknowledged. During these long months, I have had the real privilege of seeing for myself the evidence of the outstanding calibre of the French soldiers, heirs of the noblest traditions of the French Army. Nevertheless, not satisfied with this, you and all your people have added a new epic chapter to the history of France; you have gladdened the hearts of your compatriots, giving them comfort and hope as they languish under the heavy and humiliating yoke of a hated invader. . . . With my deepest gratitude for the tremendous contribution that you have made to our joint victories, my dear General.

Reports of rape and looting 
At the height of their reputation as the best mountain fighters in the Allied camp, soon came reports of extensive violence by the French forces, most notably during the advance on Rome, when the Moroccan Goumiers went on a rampage of rape and looting. When reports reached the Fifth Army headquarters about women and children being violated, goods looted, money stolen and even murder, General Clark was appalled. He contacted Juin who immediately ordered that the offenders be caught and summarily punished. Analysis of French military archives suggests that some 360 Expeditionary Corps soldiers were brought before the military courts for violent crimes committed against thousands of civilians during the Italian campaign; some were executed, the rest imprisoned.

These crimes tarnished the honour of the French army in Italy and horrified Juin and the rest of the French command. The French officers punished with equal brutality, shooting and sometimes hanging the offenders. 207 more soldiers were found guilty of sexual violence. The horrors even came to the attention of the Vatican, Pope Pius XII personally objecting to the further use of the tribesmen in Europe. In an audience granted to General de Gaulle, the pope complained about the rape and pillage. As a result of the discussion, the proposed participation of the Moroccan Goums in Operation Dragoon was canceled before being reinstated under pressure from General de Lattre.

According to Italian sources, more than 7,000 people were raped by Goumiers. A monument was erected in remembrance of the Marocchinate women in Castro dei Volsci. In 2015, the Italian state organised compensation to the victims still alive.

See also
Army of Africa
Liberation of France
Marocchinate
Moroccan Goumier

References

Citations

Sources

 Colonel Goutard (1947). Le Corps Expéditionnaire Français dans la campagne d'Italie (1943-1944). Charles-Lavauzelle & Cie.

External links
French Expeditionary Corps in Italy
 Monte Cassino - the Battle of Belvedere
 The Venafro Cemetery in Italy

Corps of France
Corps of France in World War II
Military units and formations established in 1943
Military units and formations disestablished in 1944
Italian campaign (World War II)
Battle of Monte Cassino